Barry Shaw may refer to:

 Barry Shaw (barrister), Northern Irish barrister and Director of Public Prosecutions
 Barry Shaw (footballer) (born 1948), English football winger for Darlington
 Barry Shaw (politician), candidate in National Assembly for Wales election, 2007